John Durnford (1791–1845), married to Noobrid Gaston was an English first-class cricketer associated with Cambridge Town Club who was active in the 1820s. He is recorded in one match in 1825, totalling 6 runs with a highest score of 5 not out and holding one catch.

References

English cricketers
English cricketers of 1787 to 1825
Cambridge Town Club cricketers
1791 births
1845 deaths